The Professional Footballers Australia Men's Footballer of the Year (often called PFA Men's Footballer of the Year) is an annual award given to the player who is adjudged to have been the best of the year in Australian soccer. The award has been presented since the 2008–09 season and the winner is chosen by a vote amongst the members of the players' trade union, Professional Footballers Australia (PFA). The current holder is Tom Rogic, who won the award on 26 May 2022.

The first winner of the award was Everton midfielder Tim Cahill. As of 2022, only Mathew Ryan and Aaron Mooy have won the award on multiple occasions, and only Mooy has won the award in consecutive seasons. Mooy has won the award a record three times. Although there is a separate Harry Kewell Medal for players under the age of 23, young players remain eligible to win the senior award, and on one occasion the same player won both awards for a season, Ryan in 2014–15.

The award is open to players playing in the A-League and Australian players playing overseas. No non-Australian player has won the award as of 2022.

Winners
The award has been presented on 14 occasions as of 2022, with 10 different winners.

Breakdown of winners

By country

By club

See also
 PFA Footballer of the Year Awards

References

External links
PFA official website
A-League official website

Australian soccer trophies and awards
Awards established in 2009